Ignacio Tapia (born 1 September 2004) is an Argentine footballer currently playing as a attacking midfielder for Belgrano.

Club career
Born in Primero de Mayo, Córdoba, Tapia started his career with Unión Empalme at the age of six, before moving to Belgrano a year later. He also spent time with local sides Sociedad Cultural de La Para and Sportivo Belgrano de La Para.

In November 2021, he signed a new three-year contract with Belgrano.

Career statistics

Club

References

2004 births
Living people
People from Córdoba, Argentina
Argentine footballers
Argentina youth international footballers
Association football midfielders
Primera Nacional players
Club Atlético Belgrano footballers